Votes for Women is a 1912 American silent melodrama film directed by Hal Reid. It was produced by Reliance Film Company in partnership with the National American Woman Suffrage Association and was written by suffragists Mary Ware Dennett, Harriet Laidlaw, and Frances Maule Bjorkman. The film featured cameos by prominent suffragists, including Anna Howard Shaw, Jane Addams, and Inez Milholland, and incorporated documentary footage of a women's suffrage parade in New York City.

Plot

See also 
 Women's suffrage in film

References

External links 
 

1912 films
American silent films
Films about activists
Melodrama films
Silent American drama films
1912 drama films
American black-and-white films
Media about women's suffrage in the United States
1910s American films